The Boomtown Rats' Greatest Hits is a compilation album of The Boomtown Rats' singles on Columbia Records from 1979 to 1985.

Track listing
All songs were written by Bob Geldof, except where noted.
 "I Don't Like Mondays" – 4:17
 "Rat Trap" – 5:08
 "She's So Modern" (Johnny Fingers, Geldof) – 2:57
 "Banana Republic" (Pete Briquette, Geldof) – 4:57
 "Skin on Skin" (Briquette, Geldof) – 4:37
 "Up All Night" – 3:34
 "Joey's on the Street Again" – 5:51
 "The Elephants' Graveyard (Guilty)" – 3:43
 "House on Fire" – 4:43
 "Never in a Million Years" – 3:49

References

The Boomtown Rats albums
1987 greatest hits albums
Columbia Records compilation albums